Mendham may refer to:

 Mendham, Saskatchewan, Canada
 Mendham, Suffolk, England
 Mendham Borough, New Jersey, USA
 Mendham Township, New Jersey, USA

People with the surname
John Mendham, English MP
Joseph Mendham, English clergyman and controversialist
Maurice B. Mendham, New York stockbroker
Peter Mendham, English former footballer